High comedy or pure comedy is a type of comedy characterized by witty dialogue, satire, biting humor, wordplay, or criticism of life. The term High Comedy was coined in England in 1877 by George Meredith for his Essay on Comedy.

History 
Comedy, according to Aristotle, originated from the Phallic Processions of the Dionysian festival during which men would celebrate by dressing up as Satyrs with large erect phalluses insulting each other and telling jokes at their expense. This presumably gave rise to Satyr plays wherein Satyrs were depicted getting drunk arguing with one another, insulting each other telling jokes and telling sexual and scatological jokes et cetera. A Satyr Play was performed in an effort to lighten the mood after three tragedies.  

Aristophanes chose to use the venue they created to satirize political issues such as demagoguery and the Peloponnesian War.  Aristophanes admitted that his plays presupposed a certain level of intelligence not generally expected of the hoi polloi.  Thus Aristophanes created what could best be described as High Comedy.  The Comedies of Aristophanes parodied the tragedies of Aeschylus, Sophocles and Euripides and critiqued sophistry by lampooning the person of Socrates.  

Since then some of the Comedies of William Shakespeare such as The Merchant of Venice addressed serious themes such as bigotry. Moliere the Hypochondriac depicts an eccentric protagonist who routinely requests enemas and drinks his own urine based on the advice doctors give him in exchange for his money in an effort to ridicule the businesslike operations of medical professionals.  Thus it uses what would normally be Low Comedy to satirize an important social issue and thus the play is High Comedy. 

Likewise Charlie Chaplin deliberately incorporated pathos into the character of The Tramp, a largely comic figure.  Chaplin also made movies like Modern Times and The Great Dictator which despite their reliance on slapstick actually satirized issues relating to capitalism and fascism respectively.  Monty Python's Flying Circus would routinely parody the classics and high culture as well as philosophy and political issues whilst the Dennis Moore Sketch ridiculed Communism through a Robin Hood parody.  

Today, high comedy can be seen among sitcoms and talk shows targeted at cultured and articulate audiences. Though there are also sitcoms which utilize low Comedy. Examples of high comedy include Arrested Development, The Marx Brothers, Woody Allen, Seinfeld, The Larry Sanders Show and The Office.

See also 
Low comedy
High culture

References

Comedy
Satire